Eugene M. Hughes (3 April 1934 – 10 March 2021) was an American educator who was the president of Northern Arizona University from 1979 to 1993 and the president of Wichita State University from 1993 to 1998.

References 

1934 births
2021 deaths
Presidents of Wichita State University